Shrewsbury Sixth Form College is a post-secondary co-educational sixth-form college located in Shrewsbury, the county town of Shropshire, England. The college currently has an enrolment of approximately 1,650 students, generally ranging between the ages of 16 to 19. The curriculum consists of AS, A levels and a small range of BTECs. GCSE English Language and Maths can only be taken alongside an A level programme as resits. The college was ranked as the 17th-best sixth-form college in 2012 (out of 400 institutions), has the best A-Level performance of any state-funded institution in Shropshire, and has been awarded 'Beacon Status'. The college's Welsh Bridge campus includes buildings of Grade II-listed status originally built in 1910 to house the Priory Grammar School for Boys.

History
Shrewsbury Sixth Form College was founded in 1981 and has developed into one of the top sixth forms in the country.

The college has been at the top of the sixth-form college league tables for both AS and A2 level results for many years. Nationally the college was rated as 12th- and 27th-best in 2004 and 2005, respectively, with students having an average of 305.1 UCAS points (approximately ABB/ABC at A-Level) in 2004. In 2009 AS level pass rates were at 94.7%, with 66% achieving grades A-C. For A2 level in the same period, pass levels were up to 98.7%, with 79% achieving A-C grades. In the 2010 rankings, the college had the second best A-Level performance in Shropshire, after Concord College, superseding William Brookes School, Shrewsbury School and Shrewsbury High School. In 2012, the college ranked well in The Sunday Times Schools Guide; performing well against both state and fee-paying schools, the college placed 17th nationally. In 2013, the college achieved a 98% pass rate, with more than half of the students obtaining A*-B grades.

SSFC performs well against local fee-paying schools, with the average A/AS points per student at 852, versus 873 for Shrewsbury School and 876 for Shrewsbury High School. This is higher than both the Local Authority (738) and national (731) results, and for comparison, nearby Shrewsbury College of Arts and Technology achieves a score of 574. In 2009 the college surpassed Shrewsbury School, becoming the third best A-Level institution in Shropshire after Concord College and Shrewsbury High School.

Many students go on to study at Russell Group universities. In 2013 and 2014 respectively, six and seven students were offered places at Oxford or Cambridge.

Proposed Co-Location
In November 2004 the college and nearby Shrewsbury College of Arts and Technology announced plans to relocate and build a combined campus, with Shrewsbury College's existing London Road site earmarked as a potential location. The colleges claimed that existing property "lacks modern facilities and is, in some cases, not fit for purpose". The college's then-principal, Bill Dowell, wrote in the Shropshire Star declaring that "co-location is in the very best interests of the students".

The proposals were met with resistance - with business owners in the town centre objecting the proposals early on; the local MP's opposition to the proposals (including a brief discussion in Parliament); student protests (joined by the local MP); and public consultations. The colleges branded the local MP a "chief difficulty" for his opposition to their proposals.

In November 2008, nearly 4 years after the colleges announced their plans, Shrewsbury and Atcham borough council voted against the proposals 11 to 2. Shortly after the college formally withdrew from proposals and were "revisiting other options".

Merger
In November 2015 the college alongside Shrewsbury College and New College, Telford announced a proposal to merge, in which each college would retain its own principal, "individual culture", and students would continue to apply to each college separately. In February 2016 public consultation began where the proposed name of the combined college was announced to be "Central Shropshire Colleges Group".

In April 2016 following public consultation, New College backed out and proceeded with a separate merger with Telford College of Arts and Technology; the college and Shrewsbury College continued with their merger to occur on 31 July 2016 with the name "Shrewsbury Colleges Group".

In July 2016 the college merged with Shrewsbury College (based on London Road) to form the Shrewsbury Colleges Group.

In the merged college's first Ofsted report, the college scored Inadequate in both "Behaviour and attitudes" and "Leadership and management" with the remaining scored at Good. The college attempted to, unsuccessfully, overturn the report before it was published - with Ofsted upholding the grading upon their revisit.

Campuses

The college, is located on the banks of the River Severn. The Welsh Bridge Campus occupies the main and ancillary buildings of the former Priory Grammar School for Boys  (itself built on the site of a medieval Augustinian friary).

English Bridge Campus (Abbey Foregate) – comprising Wakeman Hall and sports fields – Courses: Art & Design including Food Technology, Sport & PE, Humanities (English, Classical Civilisation, Religious Studies, Politics & History), Health & Social Care, Music & Dramatic Arts.

Welsh Bridge Campus (Priory Road) – comprising Austin, Priory Hall, Priory House, Quarry, Severn – Courses: Work Applied subjects (Business, ICT, Computer Science, Law & Economics), Social Science (Sociology, Geography, Psychology), Sciences, including electronics, Modern Foreign Languages, and Maths.

Students
The college has approximately 1,650 students. It is the sixth form for the following schools: Shrewsbury Academy (formally The Grange and Sundorne schools), Priory School, Meole Brace School, Belvidere School, Corbet School, Mary Webb School and Science College and Church Stretton School. Students from outside the 'partner schools' (listed above) are also accepted. Students in Shropshire are additionally able to go to other sixth-form colleges, which exist in Oswestry, Ludlow and Telford; however, Shrewsbury Sixth Form College has the best results of any state-funded institution in ceremonial Shropshire, including the Telford & Wrekin, and is therefore popular with all students in the county.

A-Level performance is comparable to the nearby independent fee-paying Shrewsbury School and Shrewsbury High School, resulting in a noticeable presence of previously independent-school students at the college. Female students outnumber male students. The percentage of students from a minority ethnic heritage is small, mirroring the profile in the locality. The college has a fair representation system with elected student presidents for each year representing the views and working attitudes of the current students.

Notable alumni 

 Colin Bloomfield - British radio broadcaster
 Suzanne Evans - British journalist and politician

See also
Listed buildings in Shrewsbury (northwest central area)

References

External links
Shrewsbury Colleges Group website.

Educational institutions established in 1981
Schools in Shrewsbury
Sixth form colleges in Shropshire
1981 establishments in England